The Fondo Nacional de las Artes or FNA (in English: National Endowment for the Arts, Argentina), is a cultural public organization created in Buenos Aires on 3 February 1958.  Its purpose is to promote cultural, educational and literary activities in Argentina.

The FNA, a public institution run by the Argentinian central government, pioneered internationally because of its structure and prospective politics. It was the origin and source of renowned international bodies like the Fondo Internacional para la Promoción de la Cultura de la Unesco in 1974 and other institutions in various countries. Since 1960, the FNA has given scholarships to artists and professionals to study in Buenos Aires and abroad, and also finances, every year, a large number of cultural projects. Notable international artists awarded by the FNA include:

 Joaquín Ezequiel Linares, (born 1927), studied in Paris, 1960.
 Héctor Borla, (1937–2002), studied in Buenos Aires, 1962.
 Marta Minujin, (born 1943), studied in Paris, 1960.
 Patricio Pouchulu (born 1965), studied in London, 1997–98.

The FNA also helps a large number of national, provincial, and local public institutions in the whole country (museums, libraries, archives, artistic schools, cultural institutes) through different programmes and in various financial ways. The application process, both for individuals and institutions, is complex and strict. The FNA holds a large video digital archive, offered to the general public and open to national and international researchers. The FNA is directed by a president and a body of renowned Argentinean public figures related to different artistic activities: painting, visual arts, architecture, literature, theatre, dance and music.

References 

 University of Texas, List of Argentine Institutions and Foundations/.
 FNA Budget, Official State Paper Boletin Oficial de la Republica Argentina, 2009.
 /IFACCA, article 2008.
 Legal Publishing Issues, Official State Paper, Boletin Oficial de la Republica Argentina, 1997.
 Creation of FNA, Original Presidential Decree, 1958 (in Spanish).

External links 
  

Arts organizations established in 1958
Government agencies of Argentina
Cultural organisations based in Argentina
1958 establishments in Argentina